Dzmitry Furman (born 9 July 1990) is a Belarusian rower. He competed in the 2020 Summer Olympics.

References

1990 births
Living people
Sportspeople from Minsk
Rowers at the 2020 Summer Olympics
Belarusian male rowers
Olympic rowers of Belarus
People from Luninets District